The Gibson ES-345 is a stereo guitar manufactured by the Gibson Guitar Company. The guitar was produced from 1959 to 1981. It was designed as a jazz guitar and an upscale version of the ES-335.

History
The 345 was developed in 1958 as an upscale version of the Gibson ES-335. Gibson released the ES-345T in the spring of 1959. The Gibson ES-345T had a price of $345 in the standard sunburst finish. From the guitar's 1959 introduction through 1979, 10,560 ES-345s were shipped. Gibson designed the guitar to create a guitar which could be used to produce jazz but with a maple block running through the guitar to allow the versatility of a solid body electric guitar.

Gibson released the guitar in three finishes, Cherry and Natural, and Sunburst. The sunburst finish was called the ES-345TD, the cherry finish was called the ES-345TDC and the natural finish was called the ES-345TDN.

Specifications
1958 saw the introduction of Gibson's new thinline series of guitars. The ES-335, 345 and 355, all came with a semi-hollow body: the wood of the top and back was maple and there was a maple center block inside the guitars which ran the length of the body all the way to the mahogany neck, with a rosewood fingerboard.

The neck of the guitar has double-parallelogram fretboard inlays. The guitar also featured a stereo pickup configuration and Varitone circuit. The varitone's positions were not properly defined by Gibson which left players to try describing the sounds of the varitone dial positions as: squishy, underwater, and guitar-in-a-box. What the variotone did is allow users to switch to predefined frequency scoops which kept highs and lows.

Gibson also manufactured a Gibson ES-355TD-SV which was a fancier version of the ES-345TD. Both the ES-345TD/SV and the ES-355TD-SV did not become as popular as the simple ES-335. One reason was that the ES-345 and the ES-355 each required a 'Y' cable and a TRS jack to separate the pickup signals. The much simpler mono ES-335 did not require any special equipment. The original ES-345 came with nickel parts covered in gold and PAF (pickup)s. In 1959 and 1960 the pickguard was long, extending all the way to the bridge but it was shortened in 1961.

From 1959-1963 Gibson had a Stoptail bridge but beginning in 1964 they began installing a gold trapeze tailpiece on the ES-345s. It was not until 1982 that Gibson went back to the Stoptail bridge on the ES-345. Some of the first Gibson ES-345s also shipped with a Bigsby vibrato tailpiece.

Notable players
B.B. King
Freddie King
Elvin Bishop
Bob Welch of the rock band Fleetwood Mac used a Gibson ES-345 and a heavily modified Fender Stratocaster on their 1971 album, Future Games.
George Harrison

References

External links
Video - Scott Sharrard of the Gregg Allman Band on The Gibson Varitone ES-345

ES-345
Semi-acoustic guitars
1958 musical instruments
1959 in music
Discontinued products